James Denis Turner (born April 17, 1953) is a former American Football guard in the National Football League for the New York Giants and the Washington Redskins. He played college football at Duke University before joining the Charlotte Hornets in the World Football League in 1975 as a defensive tackle and, in 1985, the Jacksonville Bulls of the United States Football League.

Turner played the role of the Even Bigger Black Guy in the movie Trading Places (1983), which starred Dan Aykroyd and Eddie Murphy. His character repeatedly utters the word 'Yeah' in a tone described by The New York Times as 'deeper than deep' to Billy Ray Valentine, played by Murphy, while imprisoned in a jail cell.

References

1953 births
Living people
American football offensive guards
Duke Blue Devils football players
New York Giants players
Washington Redskins players
People from Moultrie, Georgia
Players of American football from Georgia (U.S. state)